Slaton is a city in Lubbock County, Texas, United States founded by German immigrants. Slaton was the westernmost German settlement in Texas. The population was 6,121 at the 2010 census. Slaton is part of the Lubbock Metropolitan Statistical Area.

History
Slaton was named for Lubbock rancher and banker O.L. Slaton, Sr. (1867–1946), who promoted railroad construction in Slaton.

Geography
Slaton is on the level plains of the Llano Estacado.

Climate
According to the Köppen climate classification system, Slaton has a semiarid climate, BSk on climate maps.

Demographics

2020 census

As of the 2020 United States census, there were 5,858 people, 2,090 households, and 1,472 families residing in the city.

2000 census
As of the census of 2000,  6,109 people, 2,253 households, and 1,610 families resided in the city. The population density was 1,126.7 people per square mile (435.2/km). The 2,565 housing units averaged 473.1 per square mile (182.7/km). The racial makeup of the city was 72.35% White, 7.76% African American, 0.59% Native American, 0.16% Asian, 0.08% Pacific Islander, 17.07% from other races, and 1.98% from two or more races. Hispanics or Latinos of any race were 42.27% of the population.

Of the 2,253 households, 33.5% had children under the age of 18 living with them, 52.0% were married couples living together, 15.5% had a female householder with no husband present, and 28.5% were not families. About 25.9% of all households were made up of individuals, and 13.8% had someone living alone who was 65 years of age or older. The average household size was 2.67 and the average family size was 3.22.

In the city, the population was distributed as  29.0% under the age of 18, 10.3% from 18 to 24, 23.5% from 25 to 44, 20.9% from 45 to 64, and 16.3% who were 65 years of age or older. The median age was 35 years. For every 100 females, there were 87.7 males. For every 100 women age 18 and over, there were 83.7 men.

Males had a median income of $26,696 versus $20,601 for females. The per capita income for the city was $13,087. About 21.6% of families and 23.0% of the population were below the poverty line, including 33.7% of those under age 18 and 16.4% of those age 65 or over.

Arts and culture

Harvey House of Slaton
In 1912, the Atchison, Topeka and Santa Fe railroad, through reorganization now the Burlington Northern Santa Fe, opened a depot in Slaton. Until 1969, the train station offered passengers meals and hospitality through the Fred Harvey Company. The company advertised for "Young women, 18 to 30 years of age, of good moral character, attractive and intelligent, as waitresses in the Harvey Eating Houses on the Santa Fe Railroad in the West."

Other ATSF depots were in Amarillo, Brownwood, Gainesville, Temple, and El Paso, Texas, and in Clovis, New Mexico. After the passenger service ended, the railroad used the depot, located at 400 Railroad Avenue, for offices, training rooms, train crew-staging areas, and storage, but abandoned the building in the late 1980s. The railroad still passes by the depot. The remaining structure, known as the Harvey House, was marked for demolition, but a citizens' committee launched a nearly two-decade effort to preserve and restore it. The former depot, which calls itself "The Jewel on the Plains", can be rented for parties with catered meals and occasional entertainment options. The upstairs area, which was the living quarters of the Harvey girls' when it was a restaurant in the early 20th century, is now a fully operational bed and breakfast. The downstairs area hosts a small railroad collection museum. The West Texas Historical Association toured the Harvey House during its 2009 annual meeting in Lubbock.

Art on the Square
Several new art galleries and antique shops are on the square surrounding City Hall. Some are only open limited hours and for special events, but several are open for extended hours. Multiplicity Art Gallery, opened May 2012, has art in a diverse range of styles and price ranges. It also plays host to workshops and classes. SouthPaws and the Antique Mall are also open for extended hours.

Education
The City of Slaton is served by the Slaton Independent School District.

Infrastructure

Major roads and highways
 U.S. Highway 84
 Farm to Market Road 400
 Farm to Market Road 41

Special events

The Caprock Classic Car Club Show and Cruise takes place every third Saturday in July. The annual event showcases classic and refurbished cars and trucks. Set up around the town square, the event includes music, arts and crafts, food, and more www.slatonchamberofcommerce.org. The July 4th Festival takes place at the Slaton Park, where area musicians perform on an outdoor stage. The park is filled with games, rides, food, and more. The South Plains Air Show is a biannual event taking place the first weekend of June in odd-number years. Hosted by the Texas Air Museum Caprock Chapter, the show takes place at the City of Slaton/Larry T. Neal Memorial Airport. Re-enactments and aerobatic performances are scheduled www.thetexasairmuseum.org. The St. Joseph Sausage Fest is put on every October by St. Joseph's Catholic School. The event has been held annually since 1969 and is the school's primary fundraiser. Volunteers make 8,000–9,500 pounds of sausage to sell at the weekend-long event.

Notable people
People born in Slaton:
Jeremy Boreing (born 1979), producer
Harry Burrus (1921-2004), footballer
Dee Fondy (1924-1999), baseballer
Bobby Keys (1943-2014), saxophonist
Bill Lienhard (1930-2022), basketballer
Buddy Parker (1913-1982), baseballer
Simon Salinas (born 1955), politician

See also

Canyon Valley, Texas
Close City, Texas
Llano Estacado
North Fork Double Mountain Fork Brazos River
Ransom Canyon, Texas
Southland, Texas
Yellow House Canyon
West Texas

References

External links

Cities in Lubbock County, Texas
Cities in Texas
Lubbock metropolitan area
1911 establishments in Texas